Ben Hickey is an English retired football midfielder who played professionally in the USL A-League.

Hickey attended St. John's University where he was a 1995 First Team All American and 1996 Second Team soccer player. His senior season, the Red Storm won the NCAA Men's Division I Soccer Championship.

In February 1997, the Connecticut Wolves selected Hickey in the first round (twenty-third overall) of the USISL draft. He played the 1997 season with the Wolves, then moved to the Long Island Rough Riders for the 1998 season. In 1999, he played for the North Jersey Imperials. In 2002 and 2003, he played for the New York Freedom. He has now settled in California with his beautiful wife, Latika Hickey and three loving daughters, Ayanna, Shaelyn, and Grace.

References

Living people
Connecticut Wolves players
English footballers
English expatriate footballers
Long Island Rough Riders players
New York Freedom players
North Jersey Imperials players
St. John's Red Storm men's soccer players
USISL players
All-American men's college soccer players
Association football midfielders
English expatriate sportspeople in the United States
Expatriate soccer players in the United States
Year of birth missing (living people)